Shine FM may refer to:
 stations owned and operated by Olivet Nazarene University in the United States:
 WHZN in New Whiteland, Indiana
 WONU in Kankakee, Illinois
 WTMK in Wanatah, Indiana
 WUON in Morris, Illinois
 W237BY in Mason, Michigan
 stations owned and operated by Touch Canada Broadcasting in Alberta, Canada:
 CJGY-FM in Grand Prairie
 CJRY-FM in Edmonton
 CJSI-FM in Calgary
 a station owned and operated by Peter & John Radio Fellowship in the United States:
 WRBS-FM in Baltimore, Maryland

See also 
 Shine (disambiguation)